40th Street may refer to:

 40th Street – Lowery Street (IRT Flushing Line), a local station on the IRT Flushing Line of the New York City Subway
 40th Street (BMT Fifth Avenue Line), a station on the demolished section of the BMT Fifth Avenue Line
 40th Street (Newport Beach), an attraction in Newport Beach, California
 40th Street station (Market–Frankford Line), a SEPTA station in Philadelphia
 40th Street station (SEPTA Route 15), a SEPTA trolley station in Philadelphia
 40th Street Portal or 40th Street station, a SEPTA trolley station in Philadelphia